Bhagwantolita is a genus of moths belonging to the family Tortricidae.

Species
Bhagwantolita ganpatii Rose & Pooni, 2003

See also
List of Tortricidae genera

References

External links
tortricidae.com

Tortricidae genera
Olethreutinae